Frank Hargreaves (17 November 1902 – 1987) was an English footballer who played as an inside forward for Oldham Athletic, Everton and Rochdale. He also played reserve team and non-league football for various other clubs.

References

Ashton National F.C. players
Stalybridge Celtic F.C. players
Oldham Athletic A.F.C. players
Manchester North End F.C. players
Ashton United F.C. players
Everton F.C. players
Rochdale A.F.C. players
AFC Bournemouth players
Watford F.C. players
Clitheroe F.C. players
Footballers from Ashton-under-Lyne
1902 births
1987 deaths
English footballers
Association footballers not categorized by position